Robert Rendel (2 December 1884, in St Mary Abbots Kensington, London – 9 May 1944, in Marylebone, London) was a British actor of stage, screen, television and radio.

Career
His stage work included roles in the original Broadway productions of Somerset Maugham's The Circle in 1921, and   Arnold Ridley's The Ghost Train in 1926. In 1935 he played the Duke of Marlborough in Norman Ginsbury's Viceroy Sarah. On film, he played Sherlock Holmes in the original sound version of The Hound of the Baskervilles in 1932.

Filmography
 Slander (1916) as Harry Carson
 The Barricade (1917) as Gerald Hastings
 Her Night of Romance (1924)  as Prince George
 The Hound of the Baskervilles (1932)  as Sherlock Holmes
 Death at Broadcasting House (1934) as Sir Herbert Farquharson
 The Way of Youth (1934) as Sir Peter Marmon
 Borrow a Million (1934) as Struthers
 The Price of Wisdom (1935) as Alfred Blake
 Twice Branded (1936) as Charles Hamilton
 The Crimson Circle (1936)  as Commissioner
 Fire Over England (1937) as Don Miguel
 The Dark Stairway (1938) as Dr. Fletcher
 The Four Feathers (1939) as Colonel
 The Spy in Black (1939) as Admiral
 The Lion Has Wings (1939) as Chief of Air Staff
 Ten Days in Paris (1940) as Sir James Stevens
 Sailors Three (1940) as British Captain
 The Day Will Dawn (1942) as Captain of Destroyer

References

External links

Also noted Contract Bridge author: "How's Your Bridge" with Sydney Lenz.  "That extra Trick" and "The squeeze at auction and Contract Bridge" Rendell adopted the term "squeeze" from baseball.

1880s births
1944 deaths
British male stage actors
British male film actors
Male actors from London
20th-century British male actors